The JRV-6 was a purpose-built and custom-made , turbocharged and naturally-aspirated DOHC V6 racing engine, designed, developed and built by Jaguar, and produced between 1989 and 1994. It was based on the Austin-Rover V64V engine used in the MG Metro 6R4 Group B rally car, but bored and stroked out, and with turbochargers added.

Applcations
Jaguar XJ220
Jaguar XJR-11
Jaguar XJR-17

References

Automobile engines
Internal combustion piston engines
V6 engines
Gasoline engines by model
Engines by model
Jaguar engines